A list of films produced in the Turkey in 1972 (see 1972 in film):

See also
1972 in Turkey

References

Lists of Turkish films
1972